The Nunn Commission of Inquiry (Nunn Commission-December 2006 ) was a landmark public inquiry into Canada's youth criminal justice system. It was chaired by the Hon. D. Merlin Nunn, a retired Justice of the Supreme Court of Nova Scotia.
The Nunn Commission examined the events of October 14, 2004, in which Theresa McEvoy, of Halifax, Nova Scotia, a 52-year-old teacher's aide and mother of three boys, was killed when the car she was traveling in was broadsided by another vehicle. The other car had been stolen, and was being driven at high speeds by a serial young offender who had been mistakenly released from jail just two days previously.

The 16-year-old had been released from jail despite the notable issue of having 38 outstanding criminal charges pending against him.

The Commission convened on June 29, 2005. The Commissioner was charged with:
 determining what happened
 what the youth criminal justice policies and procedures were at the time and whether they were adequate
 determining what actions of law enforcement and Justice officials took in relation to this incident
 determining the reasons why the offender was released, and
 judging the adequacy of legislation governing youth criminal justice in Canada

Over 31 days of testimony, Commissioner Nunn heard from 47 witnesses, including the families of the principals, policing agencies, Government and court officials, educational officials, and the legal establishment. Chief commission counsel was Michael J. Messenger of Cox & Palmer. Nine parties were represented.
The Commissioner tabled his final report on December 5, 2006. The report tabled 34 recommendations in the areas of youth justice administration and accountability, youth crime legislation, and prevention of youth crime. The Commissioner's findings focused much attention on the deficiencies of the Youth Criminal Justice Act, which was cited as an important factor that led to the tragedy, along with improvements in responding to "at risk" children and youth in Nova Scotia.

The Government of Nova Scotia accepted all of the Commissioner's recommendations, and published an official response.

The Nunn Commission's findings have been cited as a significant factor in proposed changes to the Youth Criminal Justice Act. However, Commissioner Nunn has made public comments disagreeing with some aspects of the proposed legislation.

References
 
Canadian commissions and inquiries
Nova Scotia, Nunn_Commission